The 1898 Army Cadets football team represented the United States Military Academy in the 1898 college football season. In their second season under head coach Herman Koehler, the Cadets compiled a 3–2–1 record and outscored their opponents by a combined total of 90 to 51. The Cadets' two losses came against undefeated co-national champion Harvard and Yale. The Army–Navy Game was not played in 1898.

Four Army Cadets were honored on the 1898 College Football All-America Team. Fullback Charles Romeyn was a consensus first-team All-American, receiving first-team honors from Caspar Whitney and the New York Sun.  Quarterback Leon Kromer, tackle Robert Foy, and end Walter Smith were recognized as third-team All-Americans by Walter Camp.

Schedule

References

Army
Army Black Knights football seasons
Army Cadets football